Sara Houghteling (born 1977) is an American novelist and educator.

Biography
She was born in 1977 and graduated from Harvard magna cum laude in 1999. She received her Master's in Fine Arts in creative writing from the University of Michigan in 2003. She received a Fulbright scholarship to Paris, first prize in the Avery Jules Hopwood Novel Contest, and a John Steinbeck fellowship. She taught high school English at Marin Academy. In 2009, she became engaged to fellow Harvard alumnus and writer Daniel Mason, author of The Piano Tuner and A Far Country. After focusing on lost art looted during World War II for her first novel, she is currently writing her second book on a pianist searching for Hindemith's lost piano concerto after ruining his right hand practicing Brahms' Piano Concerto in B-Flat Major.

Pictures at an Exhibition 
Houghteling's first novel, Pictures at an Exhibition, was published  in 2009 by Alfred A. Knopf. It won the Edward Lewis Wallant Award and has also been released as an audio book, read by Mark Bramhall.

References

External links

 Short stories by Sara Houghteling in Harvard Magazine
 Review of Pictures at an Exhibition in The New York Times
Art and Arms - An interview with Houghteling at Guernica Magazine

1977 births
Living people
21st-century American novelists
Harvard College alumni
University of Michigan alumni
American women novelists
21st-century American women writers
Fulbright alumni